Palau sun skink (Eutropis palauensis) is a species of skink found in the Caroline Islands and Palau.

References

Eutropis
Reptiles described in 2020